Attiliosa goreensis is a species of sea snail, a marine gastropod mollusc in the family Muricidae, the murex snails or rock snails.

Description

Distribution

References

 Houart, R., 1993. Description of three new species and one new subspecies of Muricidae (Muricinae and Muricopsinae) from west Africa. Bollettino Malacologico 29(1-4): 17–30

External links
 MNHN, Paris: holotype

Gastropods described in 1993
Attiliosa